Sweet Grass County is a county located in the U.S. state of Montana. As of the 2020 census, the population was 3,678. Its county seat is Big Timber. The county was founded in 1895.

History
The Montana Legislature authorized Sweet Grass County in 1895, taking parts of Park, Meagher, and Yellowstone counties. That boundary was altered in 1913 when Stillwater County was formed from a portion of Sweet Grass; again in 1917 with the formation of Wheatland County, and in 1920 with the formation of Golden Valley County.

Climate
Sweet Grass County's climate is generally dry and cool, specified as Dfc in the Köppen-Geiger climate classification (subarctic or boreal). Average annual precipitation of 15 inches (380mm) comes in rain and snow. The summer precipitation accumulation (April through September) averages 10.5 inches (267mm). The average summer high temperature is 75.3 °F (24 °C) and the average minimum temperature during that period is 44.2 °F (6.8 °C). July and August are the hottest months. The annual average high temperature is 60.6 °F (15.9 °C) and the annual average minimum temperature is 33.6 °F (0.9 °C). The coldest temperature recorded in the county in recent times was -47 °F (-43.9 °C) in February 1936, and the warmest was 107 °F (41.7 °C) in July 2002. Big Timber receives 286 sunny days on average.

Geography

Major highways
  Interstate 90
  U.S. Highway 191
  U.S. Highway 10 (Former)

Adjacent counties

 Wheatland County - north
 Golden Valley County - northeast
 Stillwater County - east
 Park County - west
 Meagher County - northwest

National protected areas
 Custer National Forest (part)
 Gallatin National Forest (part)
 Lewis and Clark National Forest (part)

Demographics

2000 census
As of the 2000 United States census, there were 3,609 people, 1,476 households, and 987 families in the county. The population density was 2 people per square mile (1/km2). There were 1,860 housing units at an average density of 1 per square mile (0.4/km2). The racial makeup of the county was 96.98% White, 0.06% Black or African American, 0.55% Native American, 0.33% Asian, 0.03% Pacific Islander, 0.75% from other races, and 1.30% from two or more races. 1.50% of the population were Hispanic or Latino of any race. 22.5% were of Norwegian, 21.3% German, 11.4% English, 8.0% Irish and 7.8% American ancestry.

There were 1,476 households, out of which 30.80% had children under the age of 18 living with them, 60.00% were married couples living together, 4.50% had a female householder with no husband present, and 33.10% were non-families. 28.90% of all households were made up of individuals, and 14.20% had someone living alone who was 65 years of age or older. The average household size was 2.41 and the average family size was 3.00.

The county population contained 26.00% under the age of 18, 5.30% from 18 to 24, 24.70% from 25 to 44, 26.40% from 45 to 64, and 17.60% who were 65 years of age or older. The median age was 41 years. For every 100 females there were 99.50 males. For every 100 females age 18 and over, there were 98.10 males.

The median income for a household in the county was $32,422, and the median income for a family was $38,750. Males had a median income of $28,385 versus $17,245 for females. The per capita income for the county was $17,880. About 9.00% of families and 11.40% of the population were below the poverty line, including 15.10% of those under age 18 and 9.10% of those age 65 or over.

2010 census
As of the 2010 United States census, there were 3,651 people, 1,590 households, and 1,045 families in the county. The racial makeup of the county was 96.6% white, 0.7% Asian, 0.4% American Indian, 0.1% black or African American, 0.6% from other races, and 1.5% from two or more races. Those of Hispanic or Latino origin made up 1.4% of the population. In terms of ancestry, 25.3% were German, 22.6% were Norwegian, 13.0% were American, 12.8% were Irish, 10.8% were English, and 7.3% were Scottish.

Of the 1,590 households, 28.3% had children under the age of 18 living with them, 56.2% were married couples living together, 6.5% had a female householder with no husband present, 34.3% were non-families, and 30.4% of all households were made up of individuals. The average household size was 2.27 and the average family size was 2.82. The median age was 46.6 years.

The median income for a household in the county was $43,723 and the median income for a family was $56,552. Males had a median income of $35,385 versus $25,000 for females. The per capita income for the county was $22,785. About 10.0% of families and 12.1% of the population were below the poverty line, including 17.8% of those under age 18 and 9.9% of those age 65 or over.

Politics
In presidential elections, Sweet Grass County is among the most consistently Republican counties in the state or nation. The last, and one of the only, times the Democratic candidate carried the county was in 1936 when Franklin D. Roosevelt won every county in Montana. In both the 1916 and 1932 Presidential elections Sweet Grass County was the only county in Montana to be won by the Republican.

Sweet Grass County is also Republican at a local level. Democratic governor Brian Schweitzer has never won a majority of the county's vote and no Democratic gubernatorial candidate has carried the county in decades. In the Montana Senate it is represented by Republican Nels Swandal and in the Montana House of Representatives it is represented by Republican Alan Redfield.

Culture
The county was the setting of the 2009 sheep-herding documentary Sweetgrass. The film takes place in many counties in Montana but the title comes from this county.

Communities

City
 Big Timber (county seat)

Census-designated place
 Greycliff

Unincorporated communities

 Carney
 McLeod
 Meyers Creek
 Melville
 Quebec
 Sourdough

See also
 List of lakes in Sweet Grass County, Montana
 List of mountains in Sweet Grass County, Montana
 National Register of Historic Places listings in Sweet Grass County, Montana

References

 
1895 establishments in Montana
Populated places established in 1895